The Chinese Ambassador to Liberia is the official representative of the People's Republic of China to the Republic of Liberia.

History
The Republic of China (ROC) and Liberia recognised each other; from 1957 to 1977 and 1989 to 2003.

List of representatives

References 

 
Liberia
China